Cardale is a surname. Notable people with the surname include:

 Effie Julia Margaret Cardale (1873–1960), New Zealand social worker
 John Bate Cardale (1802–1877), English Irvingite
 Paul Cardale (1705–1775), English Dissenter
 Marianne Cardale de Schrimpff, archaeologist and anthropologist